Karatau (Qaratau) is an administrative center in the Talas region located in the Jambyl Region in the south of Kazakhstan. It has an estimated population of roughly 30,000 in 1999.  , the population is now 27,667. The largest city from Karatau, Taraz, is approximately 100 km to the southwest.

Name
The name Karatau means Black Mountain in the Kazakh language. Karatau was named after the Karatau Mountain range which it is located next to and was famous during the Soviet era for phosphate.

As part of the de-russification of the Kazakh language, Karatau will be re-written with Latin scripts in 2025 and spelled Qaratau.

Ghost Town

Krisha KZ reported on Karatau describing this town as a ghost town in December, 2019. The value of apartments in Karatau, according to Krisha, was between $3300–$11,500 USD.

Economy

Industry
During the Soviet Union times, the main functioning industrial enterprise in the town was the phosphorite factory.

Transportation
Karatau is connected by railway with Taraz. There is also a bus and private taxi services to Taraz.

Geography
Karatau is located along a mountain range, a northwest spur of the Tien-Shan. The range is composed of shale, sandstone, and a considerable amount of limestone and dolomite, in which karst formations are well developed. The mountains have flattened tops and steep slopes and are covered with steppe vegetation and mountain xerophytes. There are important deposits of phosphorites.

Climate
Karatau has a cold semi-arid climate (Köppen climate classification BSk) with strong continental influences.

See also
 Otrar
 Janatas
 Karatau mine
 Petroglyphs of Arpa-Uzen

References

External links
 AmerasianWorld.com's Karatau, Kazakhstan, (Black Mountain) 
 Photos of Karatau
 Karatau, Kazakhstan - Facebook Pages
 Karatay Malenkii Gorod Boshix Nadezhd 

Populated places in Jambyl Region
Populated places along the Silk Road
Cities and towns in Kazakhstan